Alpha- and Gamma-Adaptin Binding Protein, also known as AAGAB, is a human gene.

References

Further reading